Francisco Manuel da Silva (21 February 1795 – 18 December 1865) was a Brazilian songwriter and music professor. He was born and died in Rio de Janeiro. He had great prominence in the musical life of Rio de Janeiro in the period between the death of José Maurício Nunes Garcia and Antônio Carlos Gomes. He was a singer of Capela Real since 1809, and later a cello player.

He was taught by José Maurício Nunes Garcia and, most probably, by Sigismund Neukomm. He was directly responsible for Capela Imperial's reinstatement and being turned to its old beauty. He left a handful of works, spread around Rio de Janeiro, Minas Gerais and São Paulo archives, covering gospel music, modinhas and lundus.

He composed the Brazilian National Anthem, first as a patriotic march, since Dom Pedro I's resignation, later being officialized as anthem by the Brazilian Republic Revolution (1889). He also composed one opera, O prestigio da lei.

References
Gerard Béhague. "Francisco Manuel da Silva", Grove Music Online, ed. L. Macy (accessed September 6, 2006)

External links
 
 

1775 births
1865 deaths
Brazilian songwriters
Academic staff of the Federal University of Rio de Janeiro
National anthem writers
Brazilian classical composers
Brazilian male composers
Brazilian opera composers
19th-century classical composers
Male classical composers
Musicians from Rio de Janeiro (city)
19th-century Brazilian male singers